Hong In-ho (Hangul: 홍인호, born October 10, 1988), better known by his stage name Innovator (Hangul: 이노베이터), is a South Korean rapper. He was a contestant on Show Me the Money 4. He released his first album, Time Travel, on October 8, 2007.

Discography

Studio albums

Singles

References

1988 births
Living people
South Korean male rappers
South Korean hip hop singers
21st-century South Korean  male singers
FNC Entertainment artists